Merrell Valley is a valley in the Convoy Range of Antarctica.

It is officially described as:
A long, narrow ice-free valley in the Convoy Range, running north from its head immediately east of Mount Gunn into the Greenville Valley. Mapped in 1957 by the New Zealand Northern Survey Party of the Commonwealth Trans-Antarctic Expedition, 1956-58. Named by them after the USNS Private Joseph F. Merrell, a freighter in the main American convoy into McMurdo Sound in the 1956-57 season.

Sources 

Valleys of Victoria Land
Scott Coast